Kondaveeti Venkatakavi is an Indian poet, scholar, and film writer from Andhra Pradesh. He is well known for writing dialogues in the movie Daana Veera Soora Karna.

Childhood
Venkata Kavi was born as Venkatayya to Narayana and Seshamma in the village of Vipparla in Guntur district.

Education

He got primary education was from his scholarly father. He studied Sanskrit poetry and pancha kavyas under the guidance of Narikonda Nammalaraju, a poet from Gadwal. He later moved to Tenali and worked as assistant under Tripuraneni Ramaswamy Chowdary. He mastered Sriharsha Naishada under his uncle Yetukri Narasimhayya. He worked as assistant under Srimat Tirumala Mudhimalla Varadhacharya, who was working to teach Sanskrit to all sections of the people. He learned Sanskrit Vyakarana and Patanjali Bhashya from Kavi Ramanujacharya. He leaned Telugu Vyakarana from Duvvur Venkataramana Sastry. He moved to Vijayanagaram and studied the grammar under the Chinaseetarama Sastry. He later practiced Avadhanam under the guidance of Chellapilla Venkata Sastry.

Career

Teacher
He worked as a Telugu scholar in the Board High School in Macherla from 1948 to 1952, and as Sanskrit lecturer in Ponnur oriental college for forty years from 1952.

Poet

He started writing poetry at the age of 14 and wrote many books. In 1932, he wrote Karshaka Satakam about the problems of farmers. It was banned by the government. In 1946, he wrote Chennakesava Satakam. He wrote Divyasmrutulu remembering Vemana, Gurajada Apparao and other eminent Telugu personalities. He published a research work on Amuktamalyada of Krishna Devaraya. He wrote a book with rational thoughts on Melu Kolupu in 1942. 

He wrote a literary series with the name Nehru Charita.

Works
 Karshaka satakam (1932)
 Hithabhodha (1942)
 Bhagavatula vaari Vamsavali (1943)
 Udayalakshmi Nrusimhavataravali (1945)
 Chennakesava satakam (1946)
 Bhavanarayana Charita (1953)
 Divyasmrutulu (1954)
 Nehru Charitra Part I (1956)
 Trisati (1960)
 Nehru Charitra Part II (1962)
 Bali (1963)

Filmography
 Daaana Veera Soora Karna, dialogues (1977) - Debut in Films
 Sri Madvirata Parvam, dialogues (1979)
 Srimadvirat Veerabrahmendra Swami Charitra, dialogues (1984)
 Tandra Paparayudu, dialogues (1986)
 Aadi Dampatulu, lyricist (1986)

Awards
 Kaviraju title in Guntur district in 1953
 Kala Prapoorna from Andhra University in 1971
 Nandi Award for Best Dialogue Writer - Tandra Paparayudu'' (1986)

References

External Links

1918 births
1991 deaths
Indian lyricists
People from Andhra Pradesh
Telugu-language lyricists
Telugu writers
Recipients of the Sahitya Akademi Award in Telugu
20th-century Indian poets
20th-century Indian writers
People from Guntur district
20th-century Indian male writers